La Colección is a 1990 compilation album by singer Lucero on the Mexican Melody label. It was the first officially authorized compilation album by the singer as part of a multi-artist series.

Track listing
"Millones Mejor Que Tú"  Lara, Monarrez - single February 1988 
"No Puedo Estar Sin Tí"  Manuel Eduardo Castro
"Tu Amiga Fiel" Carole King
"No Me Hablen de Él"  Sue, Javier - single September 1988
"Me Gusta Tu Dinero"  José Ramón Florez, Cesar Valle
"Cuándo Llega el Amor"
"Vete Con Ella" Jeff Barry, Ellie Greenwich, Phil Spector
"Telefonómana"  Carlos Vargas, Luigi Lazareno, J. Antonio Sosa - single August 1988
"Tanto" - single February 1990
"Cuéntame" José Ramón Florez, Cesar Valle - single June 1989
"Caso Perdido" José Ramón Florez, Cesar Valle - single May 1990
"Corazón a la Deriva" - single December 1989

References

Lucero (entertainer) albums
1990 compilation albums